The Narach (Narač ; ,) is a river in north-western Belarus (Miadzieł raion, Minsk Province). It flows into the Neris (Viliya) near Maladziečna.

External links 

Rivers of Minsk Region
Rivers of Belarus